Timo Cauwenberg (born 2 October 1994) is a Belgian footballer who plays for SV Belisia in the fourth-tier Belgian Division 2 as a left-back.

External links

1994 births
Living people
Belgian footballers
Association football fullbacks
Sint-Truidense V.V. players
A.S. Verbroedering Geel players
Lommel S.K. players
Lierse Kempenzonen players
Challenger Pro League players
People from Sint-Truiden
Footballers from Limburg (Belgium)